Khanya Ceza is a South African politician of the Economic Freedom Fighters (EFF) who has been serving as a Member of the National Assembly of South Africa since 2019. Since becoming a Member of Parliament, he has been an alternate member of the Portfolio Committee on Cooperative Governance and Traditional Affairs.

References

Living people
Year of birth missing (living people)
Economic Freedom Fighters politicians
Members of the National Assembly of South Africa
21st-century South African politicians